John Allen Paulos (born July 4, 1945) is an American professor of mathematics at Temple University in Philadelphia, Pennsylvania. He has gained fame as a writer and speaker on mathematics and the importance of mathematical literacy. Paulos writes about many subjects, especially of the dangers of mathematical innumeracy; that is, the layperson's misconceptions about numbers, probability, and logic.

Early life
Paulos was born in Denver, Colorado and grew up in Chicago, Illinois and Milwaukee, Wisconsin, where he attended high school. After his Bachelor of Mathematics at University of Wisconsin (1967) and his Master of Science at University of Washington (1968), he received his PhD in mathematics from the University of Wisconsin–Madison (1974). In an interview he described himself as lifelong skeptic. He was also part of the Peace Corps in the seventies.

Career

His academic work is mainly in mathematical logic and probability theory.

His book Innumeracy: Mathematical Illiteracy and its Consequences (1988) was a bestseller and A Mathematician Reads the Newspaper (1995) extended the critique. In his books Paulos discusses innumeracy with quirky anecdotes, scenarios and facts, encouraging readers in the end to look at their world in a more quantitative way.

He has also written on other subjects often "combining disparate disciplines", such as the mathematical and philosophical basis of humor in Mathematics and Humor and I Think, Therefore I Laugh, the stock market in A Mathematician Plays the Stock Market, quantitative aspects of narrative in Once Upon a Number, the arguments for God in Irreligion, and most recently "bringing mathematics to bear on...biography" in A Numerate Life.

Paulos also wrote a mathematics-tinged column for the UK newspaper The Guardian and is a Committee for Skeptical Inquiry fellow.

Paulos has appeared frequently on radio and television, including a four-part BBC adaptation of A Mathematician Reads the Newspaper and appearances on the Lehrer News Hour, 20/20, Larry King, and David Letterman.

In 2001 Paulos taught a course on quantitative literacy for journalists at the Columbia University School of Journalism. The course stimulated further programs at Columbia and elsewhere in precision and data-driven journalism.

His long-running "ABCNews.com" monthly column Who's Counting deals with mathematical aspects of stories in the news. All the columns over a 10- year period are archived here.

He is married, father of two, grandfather of four.

Paulos tweets frequently at @JohnAllenPaulos

Awards
Paulos received the 2013 JPBM (Joint Policy Board for Mathematics) Award for Communicating Mathematics on a Sustained Basis to Large Audiences.

Paulos received the 2003 AAAS (American Association for the Advancement of Science) Award for Promoting the Public Understanding of Science and Technology.

In 2002 he received the University Creativity Award at Temple University

Paulos' article "Counting on Dyscalculia," which appeared in Discover Magazine in 1994, won a Folio Award that year

Bibliography
 
 
 
 
 
 
  (British edition titled A Mathematician Plays the Market)
 
 
 Potpourri of Writings
 "He Conquered the Conjecture", essay by Paulos on Grigory Perelman from The New York Review of Books
 Metric Mania
 Measuring Bacteria With a Yardstick
 Romantic Crushes and Bayes Theorem
 Stories vs. Statistics, NYT Opinionator piece
 How Much Oil Is Spilling?

References

External links

Paulos' website
Review excerpts of Paulos' books
Paulos speaking at Beyond Belief conference, 2007
Paulos' columns, "ABCNews.com"
Paulos' columns, The Guardian

Interview about Paulos' life in math

20th-century American mathematicians
21st-century American mathematicians
American atheists
Mathematics writers
American people of Greek descent
University of Wisconsin–Madison College of Letters and Science alumni
1945 births
Living people
Humor researchers
American skeptics
Mathematicians from Colorado
Mathematicians from Illinois
Mathematicians from Wisconsin
Science communicators
Scientists from Denver